Nikita Patsko (born 23 February 1995) is a Belarusian professional footballer who plays for Torpedo-BelAZ Zhodino.

Career
In January 2020 he signed with Swedish side AFC Eskilstuna along with Yuriy Lovets. However, after the start of 2020 Superettan season was delayed due to COVID-19 pandemic, both players returned to Belarus and re-signed with Arsenal Dzerzhinsk.

References

External links 
 
 

1995 births
Living people
Sportspeople from Vitebsk
Belarusian footballers
Association football midfielders
Belarusian expatriate footballers
Expatriate footballers in Sweden
FC Dinamo Minsk players
FC Bereza-2010 players
FC Torpedo Minsk players
AFC Eskilstuna players
FC Arsenal Dzerzhinsk players
FC Torpedo-BelAZ Zhodino players